Events in the year 1960 in Turkey.

Parliament
 11th Parliament of Turkey (up to 27 May)

Incumbents
President 
 Celal Bayar (up to 27 May)
Cemal Gürsel (from 27 May)
Prime Minister 
 Adnan Menderes (up to 27 May)
Cemal Gürsel (from 27 May)
Leader of the opposition
 İsmet İnönü (up to 27 May)

Ruling party and the main opposition
Ruling party
Democrat Party (DP) (up to 27 May)
 Main opposition
Republican People's Party (CHP) (up to 27 May)

Cabinet
23rd government of Turkey (up to 27 May)
24th government of Turkey (from 27 May)

Events
2 April – In Yeşilhisar, because of the interference of ruling party partisans İsmet İnönü the leader of the opposition was not able to continue his election campaign
 27 April – The ruling party formed a committee (popularly called Sancar komisyonu) to convict the opposition
 5 May  – Demonstrations in Ankara (known as 555K)
 27 May – Coup d'état
12 June – Beşiktaş won the championship of Turkish football league.
22 October – Census (population 27754820)
15 November – 14 members of the junta were appointed to diplomatic missionaries (exiled)

Births
23 January – Güldal Akşit, politician
3 February – İlyas Tüfekçi, footballer
8 May – Recep Akdağ, MD and politician
14 May – Sinan Alaağaç, footballer (goalkeeper)
11 June Mehmet Öz, MD
18 November – Yeşim Ustaoğlu, filmmaker and screenwriter
26 December – Cem Uzan, industrialist and politician

Deaths
22 May – İbrahim Çallı (aged 78), painter
30 May – Namık Gedik (aged 49), former minister of Interior (suicide)
23 June – İsmail Hakkı Tonguç (aged 67), one of the founders of the Village Institutes.
29 July – Hasan Saka (aged 74), a former prime minister (1940s)

Gallery

See also
1959–60 Milli Lig
Turkey at the 1960 Summer Olympics
Turkey at the 1960 Winter Olympics

References

 
Years of the 20th century in Turkey
Turkey
Turkey
Turkey